Arthur John Ryan (1 October 1880 – 4 August 1947) was an Australian rules footballer who played for the Carlton Football Club in the Victorian Football League (VFL).

Notes

External links 
		
Arthur Ryan's profile at Blueseum

1880 births
1947 deaths
Australian rules footballers from Melbourne
Carlton Football Club players
People from Carlton, Victoria